The Connolly Dam, also called the Silverwood Dam, is a rockfill embankment dam with an ungated spillway across the Rosenthall Creek and the Fitz Creek that is located in the locality of Silverwood, Southern Downs Region, part of the  Darling Downs district of  Queensland, Australia. The main purpose of the dam is for potable water supply of the Southern Downs Region. It discharges via Rosenthal Creek to join the Condamine River in east Warwick.

History
The dam was built to supply water to the town of Warwick.  The first sod was turned on Friendly Societies' Day in September 1926 by the Minister for Lands Thomas Dunstan. It was completed in 1927.

Originally known as Silverwood Dam, in September 1926, it was renamed Connolly Dam after Dan Connolly, who was Mayor of Warwick in 1910 and again from 1924 to 1932 and who had instigated in the creation of the dam.

Location and features

The  dam wall holds back the  reservoir when at full capacity. The dam is managed by the Southern Downs Regional Council.

Recreational activities

Golden perch, silver perch, Murray cod, spangled perch and eel-tailed catfish may be found in the reservoir. Golden perch dominate most catches for lure/fly anglers, while silver perch and eel-tailed catfish (dewfish) are more of a bait fishing prospect. A stocked impoundment permit is required to fish in the dam.

Connolly Dam is an "electric only" impoundment (outboards must be taken off) meaning only electric or manually powered craft may be used. Only members of the Warwick District Recreational Fish Stocking Association (WDRFSA) may take craft on the waterway, and only on weekends between sunrise and sunset. WDRFSA memberships are available from the caretaker at the dam currently costing $10. There is no boat ramp but there are many ideal locations around the dam to launch a boat. Membership cards must be shown to the caretaker prior to launching watercraft.

Camping is permitted at Connolly Dam. Toilets are provided at the lookout adjacent to dam wall.

See also

List of dams in Queensland

References

Reservoirs in Queensland
Dams completed in 1927
Darling Downs
Dams in Queensland
1927 establishments in Australia
Embankment dams
Rock-filled dams
Dams in the Murray River basin
Southern Downs Region